Kent Anderson is an American football coach and former player.  He retired from coaching in 2019 from Davis County High School in Bloomfield, Iowa, a position he has held since 2018. Anderson served as the head football coach at Iowa Wesleyan College in Mount Pleasant, Iowa from 2010 to 2011 and Waldorf University in Forest City, Iowa from 2012 to 2016, compiling a career overall coaching record of 203-105-5.
  

He played college football at Iowa State University where he was a 3 time letter winner from 1983 to 1985 as a wide receiver.        He then played professionally in the German Football League, before starting his coaching career. 

Anderson has coached at the Division 1 FBS Level, Division 3, NAIA, and High School levels.  He also coached at the highest level in Europe in the GFL German Football League for the Braunschweig Lions where Anderson's teams appeared in 12 National Championship in 15 years. His teams won 7 German Bowl titles, 1 Eurobowl and also were 3 time National Champion Runners up.

Head coaching record

College

References

Year of birth missing (living people)
Living people
American football wide receivers
Iowa State Cyclones football players
Iowa Wesleyan Tigers football coaches
North Carolina Tar Heels football coaches
Simpson Storm football coaches
Waldorf Warriors football coaches
High school football coaches in Iowa
American expatriate players of American football
American expatriate sportspeople in Germany
German Football League players